First Ditch Effort is the thirteenth studio album by the American punk rock band NOFX, released on October 7, 2016.

Release
"Six Years on Dope" was the first song released off of the album to the Fat Wreck Chords YouTube page on July 20, 2016.
"Oxy Moronic" was released to radio on September 14, 2016. First Ditch Effort was released on October 7. The span of four years between Self Entitled (2012) and First Ditch Effort was longest gap between two NOFX studio albums up to this point, and it also marked the first time since The War on Errorism (2003) that the band had not worked with Bill Stevenson; instead, the album was produced by Cameron Webb.

The song "I'm So Sorry, Tony" is a tribute to late No Use for a Name frontman Tony Sly.

Track listing

Personnel
 Fat Mike – lead vocals, bass, keyboards, piano
 Eric Melvin – rhythm guitar, backing vocals, Lead vocals on "Six Years On Dope"
 El Hefe – lead guitar, vocals, trumpet
 Erik Sandin – drums, percussion

Additional musicians
 Johnny OMM - Harmonies
 Karina Deniké - Backup Vocals on "Sid and Nancy" and "I'm So Sorry Tony"
 Joey Balls - Piano on "Sid and Nancy" and "I Don't Like Me Anymore"
 Matt Garney - Keyboards on "California Drought"
 Fletcher Dragge - Backup vocals on "I'm a Transvest-Lite"
 Brian Baker - Lead Guitar on "Dead Beat Mom"
 Luis and Toku - Guitar and Sax on "Bye Bye Biopsy Girl"
 Joey Cape - Backup Vocals on "I'm So Sorry Tony"
 Chris Shiflett - Lead Guitar on "Generation Z"
 Darius Koski - Viola on "Generation Z"
 Chris Mathewson - Keyboards on "Generation Z"
 Darla Burkett - Backup Vocals on "Generation Z"
 Fiona Sly - Backup Vocals on "Generation Z"
 Sidra Hitching - Poet on "Generation Z"

Production
 Cameron Webb and Fat Mike - producers
Engineers
Cameron Webb

Charts

First Ditch Effort (Commentary Version) 
On October 28, 2016, a commentary version of First Ditch Effort was released. It has Fat Mike giving facts, thoughts, and meanings about each track and the album itself.

References

2016 albums
NOFX albums
Fat Wreck Chords albums